The "flatnose" Morris Oxford is a series of motor car models produced by Morris of the United Kingdom from 1926 until 1930. Introduced as a replacement for the Morris Oxford bullnose, the "flatnose" Oxford models featured more traditional styling.


Oxford flatnose 1926–30

The distinctive bullnose radiator was dropped in 1926 in an updated version of the car. The engines remained the same but a new range of bodies was offered including all-steel saloons.

The frame was changed to allow half-elliptic springs to be fitted in place of the old three-quarter elliptic springs. The back end of the frame was given a deeper channel section, it now sweeps up over the rear axle. The frame also receives bracing from the running board brackets and cross hangers.

The radiator cooling surface has been increased sixty per cent and the whole assembly given the flat-fronted shape which would lead to this car's popular name.

A new all-steel dash or bulkhead now creates a firm location for bodywork and a solid support for the petrol tank. As part of that redesign a new instrument panel is provided with neatly grouped meters and glove boxes either side. The hand controls on the steering column have been upgraded. There is now a dash-operated ventilator.

Equipment now includes:

References
Footnotes

Bibliography

Oxford flatnose
Cars introduced in 1926
1930s cars